Kalim may refer to:

Kalim, Iran, a village in Mazandaran Province, Iran
Mírzá Músá (died 1887), an Apostle of Bahá'u'lláh
Shah Kalim Allah Jahanabadi, (died 1729), a late seventeenth to early eighteenth century Indian Chisti Sufi master